The Asia/Oceania Zone was one of the three zones of the regional Davis Cup competition in 1998.

In the Asia/Oceania Zone there were four different tiers, called groups, in which teams compete against each other to advance to the upper tier. Winners in Group II advanced to the Asia/Oceania Zone Group I. Teams who lost their respective ties competed in the relegation play-offs, with winning teams remaining in Group II, whereas teams who lost their play-offs were relegated to the Asia/Oceania Zone Group III in 1999.

Participating nations

Draw

 and  relegated to Group III in 1999.
 promoted to Group I in 1999.

First round

Philippines vs. Thailand

Chinese Taipei vs. Hong Kong

Pakistan vs. Pacific Oceania

Iran vs. Qatar

Second round

Thailand vs. Chinese Taipei

Iran vs. Pakistan

Relegation play-offs

Hong Kong vs. Philippines

Qatar vs. Pacific Oceania

Third round

Pakistan vs. Thailand

References

External links
Davis Cup official website

Davis Cup Asia/Oceania Zone
Asia Oceania Zone Group II